Coelodus is an extinct genus of fish in the family Pycnodontidae from the Late Jurassic to early Paleocene (Danian). Fossils of the genus have been found in:
Jurassic
 Gardies, France

Cretaceous
 Yacoraite Formation, Argentina 
 El Molino Formation, Bolivia
 Baharîje Formation, Egypt
 Ahlen and Bückeberg Formations, Germany
 Nimar Formation, India
 Alburni, Italy
 Damergou, Zinder, Niger
 Cochirleni Formation, Romania 
 La Huérguina and Cabana Formations, Spain 
 Pierre Shale, Kansas
 Tunbridge Wells Sand Formation, England
 Tucumcari Formation, New Mexico
 Twin Mountains and Paluxy Formations, Texas

Paleocene
 Tremp Formation, Spain

See also

 Prehistoric fish
 List of prehistoric bony fish

References

Pycnodontiformes genera
Late Jurassic fish
Jurassic bony fish
Cretaceous bony fish
Paleogene fish
Cretaceous–Paleogene boundary
Paleocene extinctions
Maastrichtian life
Campanian life
Santonian life
Coniacian life
Turonian life
Cenomanian life
Albian life
Aptian life
Barremian life
Hauterivian life
Valanginian life
Berriasian life
Tithonian life
Kimmeridgian life
Oxfordian life
Callovian life
Bathonian first appearances
Prehistoric fish of Africa
Cretaceous Africa
Fossils of Egypt
Fossils of Niger
Prehistoric fish of Asia
Cretaceous India
Fossils of India
Cenozoic fish of Europe
Fossils of Spain
Mesozoic fish of Europe
Cretaceous Germany
Fossils of Germany
Cretaceous Italy
Fossils of Italy
Fossils of Romania
Cretaceous Spain
Cretaceous United Kingdom
Fossils of England
Jurassic France
Fossils of France
Mesozoic fish of North America
Cretaceous United States
Fossils of the United States
Prehistoric fish of South America
Cretaceous Argentina
Fossils of Argentina
Cretaceous Bolivia
Fossils of Bolivia